The University of Sydney (USYD), also known as Sydney University, or informally Sydney Uni, is a public research university located in Sydney, Australia. Founded in 1850, it is the oldest university in Australia and is one of the country's six sandstone universities. The university comprises eight academic faculties and university schools, through which it offers bachelor, master and doctoral degrees.

The university consistently ranks highly both nationally and internationally. QS World University Rankings ranked the university top 40 in the world. The university is also ranked first in Australia and fourth in the world for QS graduate employability. It is one of the first universities in the world to admit students solely on academic merit, and opened their doors to women on the same basis as men.

Five Nobel and two Crafoord laureates have been affiliated with the university as graduates and faculty. The university has educated eight Australian prime ministers, including incumbent Anthony Albanese; two governors-general of Australia; thirteen premiers of New South Wales, including incumbent Dominic Perrottet; 20 justices of the High Court of Australia, including four chief justices. The university has produced 110 Rhodes Scholars and 19 Gates Scholars.

The University of Sydney is a member of the Group of Eight, CEMS, the Association of Pacific Rim Universities and the Association of Commonwealth Universities.

History

1850–1950

In 1848, William Wentworth, a University of Cambridge graduate, and Sir Charles Nicholson, a graduate of medicine from the University of Edinburgh Medical School, proposed a plan to expand the existing Sydney College into a larger university in the New South Wales Legislative Council. Wentworth argued that a state secular university was imperative for the growth of a society aspiring towards self-government, and that it would provide the opportunity for "the child of every class, to become great and useful in the destinies of his country". It took two attempts on Wentworth's behalf before the plan was finally adopted.

The university was established via the passage of the University of Sydney Act 1850 (NSW) on 24 September 1850, and was assented on 1 October 1850 by governor Sir Charles Fitzroy. Two years later, the university was inaugurated on 11 October 1852 in the Big Schoolroom of what is now Sydney Grammar School. The first principal was John Woolley, the first professor of chemistry and experimental physics was John Smith. Sir William Charles Windeyer was the first graduate. On 27 February 1858, the university received a royal charter from Queen Victoria, giving degrees conferred by the university rank and recognition equal to those given by universities in the United Kingdom. By 1859, the university had moved to its current site in the Sydney suburb of Camperdown.

In 1858, the passage of the Electoral Act provided for the university to become a constituency for the New South Wales Legislative Assembly as soon as there were 100 graduates of the university holding higher degrees eligible for candidacy. This seat in the New South Wales legislature was first filled in 1876, but was abolished in 1880, one year after its second member, Sir Edmund Barton, who later became the first Prime Minister of Australia, was elected to the Legislative Assembly.

In 1885 the first women to receive BA degrees from the university were Mary Elizabeth Brown and Isola Florence Thompson, while Thompson became the first woman to graduate with an MA in 1887.

Most of the estate of John Henry Challis was bequeathed to the university, which received a sum of £200,000 in 1889. This was thanks in part due to Sir William Montagu Manning (chancellor 1878–95) who argued against the claims by British tax commissioners. The following year, seven professorships were created in anatomy, zoology, engineering, history, law, logic and mental philosophy, and modern literature.

In 1924, the university awarded its first Doctor of Science in Engineering degree to John Bradfield. His thesis was titled "The City and Suburban Electric Railways and the Sydney Harbour Bridge". Bradfield went on to be the lead engineer for the construction of the Sydney Harbour Bridge.

The university's professor of philosophy from 1927 to 1958, John Anderson, was a significant figure referred to as "Sydney's best known academic". A native of Scotland, Anderson's controversial views as a self-proclaimed atheist and advocate of free thought in all subjects raised the ire of many, even to the point of being censured by the state legislature in 1943.

1950–2000
The PhD research degree was first discussed in 1944, and began in 1947. The university awarded the first PhD in 1951 to William H. Wittrick from the Faculty of Engineering on 28 April 1951 and the next two were awarded to Eleanora C. Gyarfas and George F. Humphrey from the Faculty of Science on 2 May 1951.

The New England University College was founded as part of the University of Sydney in 1938 and in 1954 was separated to become the University of New England.

During the late 1960s, the University of Sydney was at the centre of rows to introduce courses on Marxism and feminism at the major Australian universities. At one stage, newspaper reporters descended on the university to cover brawls, demonstrations, secret memos and a walk-out by David Armstrong, a philosopher who held the Challis Chair of Philosophy from 1959 to 1991, after students at one of his lectures openly demanded a course on feminism. The philosophy department split over the issue into the Traditional and Modern Philosophy Department, headed by Armstrong and following a more traditional approach to philosophy, and the General Philosophy Department, which follows the French continental approach. The Builders Labourers Federation placed a ban on the university after two women tutors were not allowed to teach a course but the issue was quickly resolved internally.

Under the terms of the Higher Education (Amalgamation) Act 1989 (NSW), the following bodies were incorporated into the university in 1990:

 Sydney branch of the Sydney Conservatorium of Music
 Cumberland College of Health Sciences
 Sydney College of the Arts of the Institute of the Arts
 Sydney Institute of Education of the Sydney College of Advanced Education (prior to 1981, named the Sydney Teachers College). 
 Institute of Nursing Studies of the Sydney College of Advanced Education
 Guild Centre of the Sydney College of Advanced Education.

The Orange Agricultural College (OAC) was originally transferred to the University of New England under the act, but then transferred to the University of Sydney in 1994, as part of the reforms to the University of New England undertaken by the University of New England Act 1993 and the Southern Cross University Act 1993. In January 2005, the University of Sydney transferred the OAC to Charles Sturt University.

2000s

In 2001, the University of Sydney chancellor, Dame Leonie Kramer, was forced to resign by the university's governing body. In 2003, Nick Greiner, a former Premier of New South Wales, resigned from his position as chair of the university's Graduate School of Management because of academic protests against his simultaneous chairmanship of British American Tobacco (Australia). Subsequently, his wife, Kathryn Greiner, resigned in protest from the two positions she held at the university as chair of the Sydney Peace Foundation and a member of the executive council of the Research Institute for Asia and the Pacific.

In 2005, the Public Service Association of New South Wales and the Community and Public Sector Union were in dispute with the university over a proposal to privatise security at the main campus (and the Cumberland campus).

In February 2007, the university agreed to acquire a portion of the land granted to St John's College (a residential college of the university) to develop the Sydney Institute of Health and Medical Research, now the Charles Perkins Centre, named in honour of the first Indigenous Australian man to graduate from the university, Charles Perkins.

2010s 

In 2010, the university received a Pablo Picasso painting from the private collection of an anonymous donor. The painting, Jeune Fille Endormie, which had not been publicly seen since 1939, depicts the artist's lover, Marie-Thérèse Walter and was donated on the strict understanding that it would be sold and the proceeds directed to medical research. In June 2011, the painting was auctioned at Christie's in London and sold for £13.5 million ($20.6 million AUD). The proceeds of the sale funded the establishment of many endowed professorial chairs at the Charles Perkins Centre, where a room dedicated to the painting, now exists.

At the start of 2010, the university controversially adopted a new logo. It retains the same university arms, however it takes on a more modern look. There have been stylistic changes, the main one being the coat of arm's mantling, the shape of the escutcheon (shield), the removal of the motto scroll, and also others more subtle within the arms itself, such as the mane and fur of the lion, the number of lines in the open book and the colouration. The original Coat of Arms from 1857 continues to be used for ceremonial and other formal purposes, such as on testamurs.

Action initiated by then-Vice Chancellor Michael Spence to improve the financial sustainability of the university caused controversy among some students and staff. In 2012, Spence led efforts to cut the university's expenditure to address the financial impact of a slowdown in international student enrolments across Australia. This included redundancies of a number of university staff and faculty, though some at the university argued that the institution should have cut back on building programs instead. Critics argued the push for savings was driven by managerial incompetence and indifference, fuelling industrial action during a round of enterprise bargaining in 2013 that also reflected widespread concerns about public funding for higher education.

An internal staff survey in 2012/13, which found widespread dissatisfaction with how the university was being managed. Asked to rate their level of agreement with a series of statements about the university, 19 per cent of those surveyed believed "change and innovation" were handled well by the university. In the survey, 75 per cent of university staff indicated senior executives were not listening to them, while only 22 per cent said change was handled well and 33 per cent said senior executives were good role models.

In the first week of semester, some staff passed a motion of no confidence in Spence because of concerns he was pushing staff to improve the budget while he received a performance bonus of $155,000 that took his total pay to $1 million, in the top 0.1 per cent of income earners in Australia. Fairfax reported Spence and other Uni bosses have salary packages worth ten times more than staff salaries and double that of the Prime Minister.

During Spence's term, the university community was divided over allowing students from an elite private school, Scots College, to enter university via a "pathway of privilege" by means of enrolling in a Diploma of Tertiary Preparation rather than meeting HSC entry requirements. The university charged students $12,000 to take the course and have since successfully admitted a number of students to degree courses. An exposé by Fairfax which turned out to be based on a misunderstanding as to VET and UAC matriculation standards, the scheme has been criticised by Phillip Heath, the national chairman of the Association of Heads of Independent Schools of Australia.

Concerns about public funding for higher education were reflected again in 2014 following the federal government's proposal to deregulate student fees. The university held a wide-ranging consultation process, which included a "town hall meeting" at the university's Great Hall on 25 August 2014, where an audience of students, staff and alumni expressed deep concern about the government's plans and called on university leadership to lobby against the proposals. Throughout 2014, Spence took a leading position among Australian vice-chancellors in repeatedly calling for any change to funding to not undermine equitable access to university while arguing for fee deregulation to raise course costs for the majority of higher education students.

An investigation by Fairfax in 2015 revealed widespread cheating at universities across NSW, including the University of Sydney. The university established a taskforce on academic misconduct in April 2015 to reduce cheating and academic misconduct.

A 2016 investigation by the Australian Broadcasting Corporation exposed corporate deals between the Veterinary Faculty and large pet food companies had resulted in the withholding of harmful cat food product tested to protect corporate sponsors.

In 2016, the university introduced plans to consolidate existing degrees to reduce the overall number of programs it offered. In the 2019 Student Experience Survey, the University of Sydney recorded the second lowest student satisfaction rating out of all Australian universities, and the second lowest student satisfaction rating out of all New South Wales universities, with an overall satisfaction rating of 74.2; this was lower than the national average rating of 78.4.

Campus

Main campus

The main campus has been ranked in the top 10 of the world's most beautiful universities by the British Daily Telegraph and the American Huffington Post, among others such as Oxford, and Cambridge and is spread across the inner-city suburbs of Camperdown and Darlington.

Originally housed in what is now Sydney Grammar School, in 1855 the government granted land in Grose Farm to the university, three kilometres from the city, which is now the main Camperdown campus. In 1854, the architect Edmund Blacket accepted a senate invitation for the first buildings to be designed. In 1858 the Great Hall was finished, and in 1859 the Main Building was built. He composed the original Neo-Gothic sandstone Quadrangle and Great Tower buildings, which were completed in 1862. The rapid expansion of the university in the mid-20th century resulted in the acquisition of land in Darlington across City Road. The Camperdown/Darlington campus houses the university's administrative headquarters, and the Faculties of Arts, Science, Education and Social Work, Pharmacy, Veterinary Science, Economics and Business, Architecture, and Engineering. It is also the home base of the large Sydney Medical School, which has numerous affiliated teaching hospitals across the state.

The main campus is also the focus of the university's student life, with the student-run University of Sydney Union (once referred to as "the Union", but now known as "the USU") in possession of three buildings – Wentworth, Manning and Holme Buildings. These buildings house a large proportion of the university's catering outlets, and provide space for recreational rooms, bars and function centres. One of the largest activities organised by the Union is Welcome Week (formerly Orientation Week or 'O-week'), a three-day festival at the start of the academic year. Welcome Week centres on stalls set up by clubs and societies on the Front Lawns.

The main campus is home to a variety of statues, artworks, and monuments. These include the Gilgamesh Statue and the Confucius Statue.

Some other architects associated with the university were Walter Liberty Vernon, Walter Burley Griffin, Leslie Wilkinson, and the New South Wales Government Architect. The building was designed in accordance with the university's masterplan by the architect and founding dean of the  university's architecture faculty, Leslie Wilkinson, who himself was inspired by a previously unused masterplan developed for the campus by Walter Burley Griffin in 1915.

The 2002 conservation plan of the university stated that the Main Building and Quadrangle, Anderson Stuart Building, Gate Lodges, St Paul's College, St John's College and St Andrew's College "comprise what is arguably the most important group of Gothic and Tudor Revival style architecture in Australia, and the landscape and grounds features associated with these buildings, including Victoria Park, contribute to and support the existence and appreciation of their architectural qualities and aesthetic significance."

In 2015, The NSW Department of Planning and Environment endorsed The University of Sydney's $1.4 billion Campus Improvement Plan which involved a number of new important structures and renovations.

As of 2016, the university is undertaking a large capital works program with the aim of revitalising the campus and providing more office, teaching and student space. The program will see the amalgamation of the smaller science and technical libraries into a larger library, and the construction of a central administration and student services building along City Road. A new building for the School of Information Technologies opened in late 2006 and has been located on a site adjacent to the Seymour Centre. The busy Eastern Avenue thoroughfare has been transformed into a pedestrian plaza and a new footbridge has been built over City Road. The new home for the Sydney Law School, located alongside Fisher Library on the site of the old Edgeworth David and Stephen Roberts buildings, has been completed. The university opened a new building called "Abercrombie Building" for business school students in early 2016.

The NSW state government has reduced transport links to the old campus and the closest Redfern railway station leaving main access to buses on the neighbouring Parramatta Road and City Road, prioritising the growth at other Sydney universities.

From 2007, the university has used space in the former Eveleigh railway yards, just to the south of Darlington, for examination purposes.

In 2018, New South Wales Minister for Heritage, Gabrielle Upton agreed to put the University of Sydney and some adjacent sites on the state heritage register, creating a conservation area that would include the Camperdown campus, and the nearby Victoria Park.

The beginning of 2021 saw the closure of the Cumberland campus, with a number of health disciplines moving to the Camperdown campus in the state-of-the-art, purpose built Susan Wakil Health Building.

Satellite campuses
 Sydney Dental Hospital located in Surry Hills and the Westmead Centre for Oral Health is attached to Westmead Hospital.
 The Sydney Conservatorium of Music: Formerly the NSW State Conservatorium of Music, the Sydney Conservatorium of Music (SCM) is located in the Sydney CBD on the edge of Sydney's Royal Botanic Garden, a short distance from the Sydney Opera House. It became a faculty of the university in the 1990s and incorporates the main campus Department of Music, which was the subject of the documentary Facing the Music.
 Camden campus: Located in one of the most rapidly growing peri-urban areas in the country, Sydney's southwest. The Camden campus houses lecture theatres, research institutes, veterinary clinics and research farms for bioscience, environmental science, agriculture and veterinary science.
 Sydney CBD campus: The University of Sydney Business School CBD campus is located on Castlereagh Street in the heart of Sydney's CBD close to Town Hall station.

The university also uses a number of other facilities for its teaching activities. 
 Sydney Medical School has eight clinical schools at its affiliated hospitals, responsible for clinical education at the hospitals. 
Sydney Pharmacy School is one of the smaller at the university, and is positioned with its own building, the sandstone Pharmacy and Bank Building, with associated laboratories and academic staff wings below and around 
 One Tree Island is an island situated within the World Heritage Site Great Barrier Reef Marine Park about 20 km east-southeast of Heron Island and about 90 km east-northeast of Gladstone on the Queensland coast, and hosts a tropical marine research station of the School of Geosciences. 
 The IA Watson Grains Research Centre located at Narrabri in north-central New South Wales is a research station of the Faculty of Agriculture and Environment. 
 The Molonglo Observatory is located in Hoskinstown, near Canberra. 
 Maningrida is a base camp for scientific expeditions in the Northern Territory.
 Arthursleigh is an agricultural estate located near Goulburn. An art studio is located in Paris, France, while the Australian Archaeology Centre is located in Athens, Greece.
 Taylors College at Waterloo in Sydney is operated by the university for its Foundation Program, catering to international students wishing to enter the university.

Library

The University of Sydney Library consists of 11 individual libraries located across the university's various campuses. The Fisher and Health sciences libraries offer disability support services. According to the library's publications, it is the largest academic library in the southern hemisphere; university statistics show that in 2007 the collection consisted of just under 5 million physical volumes and a further 300,000 e-books, for a total of approximately 5.3 million items. It is also the only university in Australia to be a state legal deposit library according to the Copyright Act 1968 which stipulates that a copy of every printed material published in NSW be sent to the University Library. The Rare Books Library possesses several extremely rare items, including one of the two extant copies of the Gospel of Barnabas and a first edition of Sir Isaac Newton's Philosophiae Naturalis Principia Mathematica.

Centre for Continuing Education
The Centre for Continuing Education is an adult education provider within the university. Extension lectures at the university were inaugurated in 1886, 36 years after the university's founding, making it Australia's longest running university continuing education program.

Museums and galleries

The Chau Chak Wing Museum showcases the university's art, natural history and antiquities collections. Located opposite the quadrangle buildings, the museum opened to the public in November 2020. It houses the Nicholson Collection of antiquities, the Macleay Collections of natural history, ethnography, science and photography, and the University Art Collection. The museum is named after Chau Chak Wing, a Chinese-Australian businessman and philanthropist. In 2021, the Chau Chak Wing Museum won the Museums and Galleries National Award (MAGNA) and two Museums Australasia Multimedia and Publication Design Awards (MAPDA).

Collections
 The Nicholson Collection of archaeology is the largest collection of antiquities in Australia. The Nicholson Museum was founded in 1860 by the donation of Sir Charles Nicholson (Sydney University's second chancellor 1854–1862). It is also the country's oldest university museum and features ancient artefacts from Egypt, the Middle East, Greece, Rome, Cyprus and Mesopotamia, collected by the university over many years and added to by recent archaeological expeditions. The museum was located in the historic Main Quadrangle at the university. The Nicholson Museum closed to the public in 2020, ahead of the opening of the Chau Chak Wing Museum.
 The Macleay Collection is named after Alexander Macleay, whose collection of insects begun in the late 18th century was the basis upon which the Macleay Museum was founded in 1887. It is the oldest collection of natural history in Australia and has developed into a major collection of natural history specimens, ethnographic artefacts, scientific instruments and historic photographs. The Macleay Museum closed to the public in 2016 ahead of the opening of the Chau Chak Wing Museum.
 The University Art Collection was founded in the 1860s and contains more than 7,000 pieces, constantly growing through donation, bequests and acquisition. The University Art Gallery opened in 1959. The gallery hosted numerous exhibitions until 1972, when it was taken over for office space. The gallery closed to the public in 2016 ahead of the opening of the Chau Chak Wing Museum.

Other collections and galleries
 The Rare Books Library is a part of the Fisher Library and holds 185,000 books and manuscripts which are rare, valuable or fragile, including 80 medieval manuscripts, works by Galileo, Halley and Copernicus as well as an extensive collection of Australiana. The copy of the Gospel of Barnabas and a first edition of Philosophiae Naturalis Principia Mathematica by Sir Isaac Newton are held here. Regular exhibitions of rare books are held in the exhibition room. 
 Verge Gallery is run by the University of Sydney Union and showcases contemporary art by emerging artists.

Halls of residence and residential colleges

The university has a number of halls of residence (based on research-lead living-learning principles) and residential colleges, each with its own distinctive style and facilities. All offer a wide range of cultural, social, sporting and leadership activities along with targeted academic support in a supportive communal environment. The Halls of Residence are owned and operated by the University Accommodation Service. Starting in 2013, the university committed to creating the Halls of Residence (an additional 4,000-6,000 residential places) at an affordable price to enhance the educational experience of living on campus and to offer more students a rich academic environment in which to live.
 The Queen Mary Building
 Abercrombie Student Accommodation
 Regiment Hall

The University Student Accommodation Service were awarded the Asia-Pacific Student Housing Operation of the Year & Excellence in Facility Development and Management in 2016.

The Student Accommodation Service and the Mana Yura Student Support Service were the first in Australia to implement an Aboriginal and Torres Strait Islander On-Campus Residence Halls Scholarship Guarantee.

Additionally, the university owns and operates International House.

Affiliated with the university are six religiously denominated colleges. Unlike some residential colleges in British or American universities, the colleges are not affiliated with any specific discipline of study. 
 International House
 St John's College
 St Andrew's College
 St Paul's College
 Sancta Sophia College
 Wesley College
 The Women's College
 Mandelbaum House

There is a university-affiliated housing cooperative, Stucco.

A quarter of the university's female students residing in university colleges have been found to face sexual harassment. Between 2011 and 2016, there were 52 officially reported cases of sexual abuse and harassment on campus released by the university, resulting in 1 expulsion, 1 suspension and 4 reprimands. This is less than the 2017 Australian Human Rights Commission report on sexual assault and harassment which found reported figures substantially higher than this. 71% of students surveyed in 2017 reported not knowing how to make a report relating to sexual assault or harassment. Imogen Grant from the SRC said students who had experienced sexual assault had come forward believing that "navigating the university bureaucracy exacerbates trauma and often seems futile". Previously a 2015 survey of 2,000 students found that 57 per cent of respondents did not know where to seek help or how to report sexual misconduct at USYD, and only 1.4% of all serious sexual incidents are reported. After the release of the 2017 report the vice-chancellor said the university was committed to implementing "all of the recommendations contained in the report". Graphic videos emerged in 2018 of male students bragging of their sexual feats over the female students, particularly first-years.

Gallery

Organisation
The university comprises eight faculties and schools:
 Faculty of Arts and Social Sciences
 University of Sydney Business School
 Faculty of Engineering
 Faculty of Medicine and Health
 Faculty of Science
 Sydney School of Architecture, Design and Planning
 Sydney Conservatorium of Music
 Sydney Law School

The five largest faculties and schools by 2020 student enrolments were (in descending order): Arts and Social Sciences; Medicine and Health; Business; Science; Engineering. Together they constituted nearly 88% of the university's students and each had a student enrolment over 8,000 (at least 13% of total students).

Academic profile

Rankings

The 2022 QS World University Rankings ranked the University of Sydney at 38th in the world, second nationally and top-ranked university in New South Wales. In addition, it is ranked 27th in the world by academic reputation. By subject, QS ranked the university in the top 50 across all five broad subject areas.

 15th in Arts and Humanities
 39th in Engineering and Technology
 15th in Life Sciences and Medicine
 43rd in Natural Sciences
 14th in Social Sciences and Management

Additionally, the University of Sydney is ranked second in sports-related subjects, tenth in anatomy & physiology, 11th in veterinary science, 12th in education, 14th in law and legal studies, 15th in nursing, 16th in architecture, 18th in accounting and finance, 18th in English language and literature, 18th in medicine and 18th in pharmacy and pharmacology.

The 2020 QS Graduate Employability Rankings ranked the University of Sydney graduates fourth most employable in the world and first in Australia and the Asia Pacific region.

The 2021 Times Higher Education World University Rankings ranked the University of Sydney 51st in the world and second in Australia. By subject area, the university is ranked:

 58th in Arts and Humanities
 37th in Clinical, Pre-clinical and Health
 76th in Engineering and Technology
 47th in Life Sciences
 97th in Physical Sciences
 68th in Social Sciences
 83rd in Business and Economics 
 101-125th in Computer Science
 33rd in Law
 24th in Education
 65th in Psychology

Additionally, the 2020 Times Higher Education World Reputation Rankings ranked the University of Sydney 51-60th most reputable in the world and 35th in the world in the Global University Employability Ranking 2020. According to the 2020 Impact Rankings by Times Higher Education, the university is ranked second in the world.

The 2021 U.S. News & World Reports Best Global Universities Rankings placed the University of Sydney 27th in the world and second in Australia. In the 2022 Academic Ranking of World Universities published by the Shanghai Ranking Consultancy, the University of Sydney is ranked 60th and in the top 0.6% of the top 1000 universities in the world.

The University of Sydney is ranked first in Australia and 29th overall in the 2017 CWTS Leiden Rankings for research impact. In 2019, the University of Sydney is ranked 33rd among the universities around the world by SCImago Institutions Rankings. In 2019, Performance Ranking of Scientific Papers for World Universities by National Taiwan University, the University of Sydney is ranked 26th in the world, second in Australia. The University of Sydney is ranked first in Australia and 20th in the world according to the 2021-2022 University Ranking by Academic Performance.

The University of Sydney Business School has cemented its place among the world's leading providers of business education with accreditations from AACSB, AMBA and EQUIS - leading authorities on postgraduate management studies, thereby achieving the top 1 percent "triple crown" status.

The London-based Financial Times has ranked the University of Sydney Business School's flagship Master of Management as Australia's number one program of its kind for the eighth consecutive year since 2013. The Master of Management (MMgt) program was also ranked in the world's top 5 for "career progress" made by its graduates in 2019.

In terms of alumni wealth, the number of wealthy Sydney alumni was ranked fifth outside the United States, behind Oxford, Mumbai, Cambridge and the London School of Economics according to the American Broadcasting Company. Business magazine Spear's placed the University of Sydney 44th in the world and second in Australia in its table of "World's top 100 universities for producing millionaires".

Endowments and research grants

The university has received a number of significant bequests and legacies over its history. The following are current professorships (chairs), funds, fellowships and scholarships which are funded by bequests and legacies and named after benefactors:
 Douglas Burrows Chair of Paediatrics and Child Health
 John Challis Bequest for chairs in Law, International Law, Jurisprudence, Anatomy, Biology, Civil Engineering, English Literature, History and philosophy (see Challis Professorship)
 Carlyle Greenwell Research Fund in Anthropology and Archaeology
 Edwin Cuthbert Hall Chair of Middle Eastern Archaeology
 Mitchell Notaras Fellowship in Colorectal Surgery
 Robert W Storr Chair for Hepatic Medicine
 The Peter Nicol Russell Undergraduate Scholarship

Coat of arms

The Grant of Arms was made by the College of Arms in 1857. The grant reads:
Argent on a Cross Azure an open book proper, clasps Gold, between four Stars of eight points Or, on a chief Gules a Lion passant Guardant also Or, together with this motto "Sidere mens eadem mutato" to be borne and used forever hereafter by the said University of Sydney on their Common Seal, Shields or otherwise according to the Law of Arms.

The use of eight-pointed stars was unusual for arms at the time, although they had been used unofficially as emblems for New South Wales since the 1820s and on the arms of the Church of England Diocese of Australia in 1836.

According to the university, the Latin motto Sidere mens eadem mutato can be translated to "the stars change, the mind remains the same." Francis Merewether, Vice-Chancellor and later Chancellor, in 1857 proposed "Coelum non animum mutant" from Horace (Ep.1.11.27) but after objections changed it to a metrical version including "Sidus" (Star), a neat reference to the Southern Cross and perhaps the Sydney family link with Sir Philip Sidney's "Astrophel (Star-Lover) & Stella (Star)". Author and university alumnus Clive James quipped in his 1981 autobiography that the motto loosely implies "Sydney University is really Oxford or Cambridge laterally displaced approximately 12,000 miles."

Student organisations

 Student Representatives: Politically and academically, undergraduate students are represented by the University of Sydney Students' Representative Council (SRC) and postgraduate students by the Sydney University Postgraduate Representative Association (SUPRA).
 University of Sydney Union: The University of Sydney Union (USU) is the oldest and largest university union in Australia. USU provides a range of activities, programs, services and facilities geared at giving students the university experience. This involves delivering clubs and societies program, a varied entertainment program, student opportunities, a range of catering and retail services plus buildings and recreational spaces for students, staff and visitors.

The SRC and Union are both governed by student representatives, who are elected by students each year. Elections for the USU board of directors occur in first semester; elections for the SRC president, and for members of the Students' Representative Council itself, occur in second semester, along with a separate election for the editorial board of the student newspaper Honi Soit, which is published by the SRC.

Charles Perkins Oration and Prize

Since 2000, the Dr Charles Perkins Oration has been held by the university, in honour of its first Aboriginal graduate, Charlie Perkins. The orations have been delivered by prominent First Nations people, including Linda Burney, Pat Anderson, Daniel Browning, Mick Gooda and Ken Wyatt.

The Oration includes the Charles Perkins Memorial Prize, which recognises the achievements of the top three Indigenous students at the university, based on the highest academic results in their field.

In 2021, the awards event could not be held in the great hall, owing to the COVID-19 pandemic in Australia, but Perkins' daughter, filmmaker Rachel Perkins, announced the recipients, and introduced Tony McAvoy, Australia's first Indigenous Queen's Counsel, to deliver the oration.

Notable alumni 

University of Sydney alumni have made significant contributions to both Australia and the world for the past  years.

Notable alumni of Sydney include eight prime ministers, the most of any university, three chief justices of the High Court, four federal opposition leaders, two governors-general, nine federal attorneys-general, 13 premiers of New South Wales including incumbent Premier Dominic Perrottet and 20 justices of the High Court—more than any other law school in Australia. The faculty has also produced 24 Rhodes Scholars and several Gates Scholars. Internationally, alumni of Sydney Law School include the third president of the United Nations General Assembly and a president of the International Court of Justice (in each case, the only Australians to date to hold such positions).

The University of Sydney is associated with five Nobel laureates: in chemistry John Cornforth (alumnus; the only Nobel Laureate born in New South Wales) and Robert Robinson (staff); in economics, John Harsanyi (alumnus); and in physiology or medicine, John Eccles and Bernard Katz (both staff).

The School of Physics has played an important role in the development of radio astronomy in particular: Ruby Payne-Scott conducted the first interferometric observations in radio astronomy with the sea-cliff interferometer at Dover Heights; alumnus Ron Bracewell proposed the nulling interferometer to image extrasolar planets, made contributions to the theory of the Fourier Transform and X-ray tomography, and proposed the idea of the Bracewell probe in SETI; and alumnus Bernard Mills led the construction of the Mills Cross Telescope and Molonglo Observatory Synthesis Telescope in the ACT. School of Physics alumnus and Crafoord Laureate Edwin Salpeter discovered the form of the initial mass function of stars, the importance of beryllium-8 in stellar nuclear fusion, and independently with Yakov Zel'dovich proposed the black hole accretion disk model of active galactic nuclei. The Apollo 14 Mission Scientist Philip K. Chapman and the first Australian-born astronaut to fly in space Paul Scully-Power are both alumni of the university. Chaos theory pioneer and Crafoord Laureate Robert May is an alumnus of and former professor at the School of Physics, best known for his exploration of the logistic map bifurcations.

In the performing arts, notable alumni include soprano Joan Sutherland; Shakespearean actor John Bell actor, producer and director Dolph Lundgren;and Bahraini–Sri Lankan actress Jacqueline Fernandez.
In international politics, notable alumni include former chief minister of Uttar Pradesh, Akhilesh Yadav and premier of British Columbia, John Horgan. In community activism, notable alumni include Aboriginal activist Charlie Perkins; feminists Eva Cox and Germaine Greer.

Tourism 
The University of Sydney has seen a considerable increase in number of visitors, specifically, a 4,000 visitor increase between 2017 and 2019. A 2019 news article reported that some Chinese tour services were incorrectly claiming the university's Quadrangle was a filming location for the Harry Potter series.

See also 

 Frontiers of Science (1962–87)
 Jacaranda (University of Sydney)
 List of universities in Australia
 National Computer Science School (NCSS)
 NICTA – National Information and Communication Technology Research Centre, co-supported by University of Sydney
 Power Institute of Fine Arts

References

Citations

Sources 

 Williams, Bruce. Liberal education and useful knowledge: a brief history of the University of Sydney, 1850–2000, Chancellor's Committee, University of Sydney, 2002.

External links 

 University of Sydney website
 University of Sydney Union
 University of Sydney athletics

 
1850 establishments in Australia
Educational institutions established in 1850
University of Sydney
Universities in Sydney
Group of Eight (Australian universities)
Universities established in the 19th century
Edmund Blacket buildings in Sydney
Sandstone buildings in Australia
Camperdown, New South Wales
Green bans